Battle of Lode was a battle fought during the Livonian War, between Sweden and Russia on 23 January 1573. The battle was won by the Swedes.

Battle
On 23 January a Swedish army of 700 infantry and 600 cavalry under the command of Clas Åkesson Tott clashed with a Russian army under the command of Simeon Bekbulatovich, by the village of Koluvere, just outside Lode. Tott gave orders to his cavalry to engage the Russians. Despite being heavily outnumbered, they managed to tear up the enemy formations and break in, but were later forced to retreat due to the enemies numerical superiority. Tott, however, used this opportunity to strike with his infantry and cavalry once more and after a while the whole Russian force was scattered, and fled. The Swedish cavalry persecuted and cut down many Russians during their rout.

According to the Swedish source, the Russian force numbered 16,000 and lost about 7,000 men during the battle, a number which, most likely, is exaggerated – nonetheless, the losses suffered were probably heavy. The Swedish casualties, however, were light. Tott returned to Reval with all his artillery, hundreds of horses, and a large number of sleds abandoned by the Russians during their rout. The Russian Czar, Ivan IV, later began peace negotiations and sent a letter to Johan III, King of Sweden. But due to previous negotiations, the Swedish King doubted the Russian desire to make peace.

References

Sources
Sundberg, Ulf: Svenska krig 1521-1814, p. 78, Hjalmarson & Högberg Bokförlag, Stockholm 2002, 
Anders Anton von Stiernman, Swea och Götha Höfdinga-Minne, Volym 2
Fridolf Ödberg, Tidsbilder ur 1500-talets svenska häfder, C. E. Fritzes kungl. hofbokhandel, 1896
Сказанія князя Курбскаго, Андрей Михайлович Курбский

Conflicts in 1573
1573 in Europe
16th century in Estonia
Battles of the Livonian War
Battles in Estonia
Battles involving Sweden
Battles involving Russia
Lääne-Nigula Parish